Billings station is a historic train depot in the Historic District of downtown Billings, Montana, United States. The depot was constructed to serve as a passenger station for the Northern Pacific Railway, Great Northern and Chicago, Burlington and Quincy. All three railroad merged to form the Burlington Northern Railroad in 1970, along with the Spokane, Portland and Seattle Railway. In 1971 Amtrak took over passenger service throughout the country.

The station has been a contributing property on the Billings Historic District since 1978, listed as the Northern Pacific Depot. The last regular Amtrak train, the North Coast Hiawatha, departed in October 1979.

Today, the depot has been renovated into a popular events center.

External links 
Official Website

References

Buildings and structures in Billings, Montana
Former Amtrak stations in Montana
Former Great Northern Railway (U.S.) stations
Former Northern Pacific Railway stations
Former Chicago, Burlington and Quincy Railroad stations
Railway stations in the United States opened in 1909
Railway stations closed in 1979
Historic district contributing properties in Montana
1882 establishments in Montana Territory
1979 disestablishments in Montana
National Register of Historic Places in Yellowstone County, Montana
Railway stations on the National Register of Historic Places in Montana
Repurposed railway stations in the United States